Benjamin Thompson, professionally known as Madd Hatta and Mista Madd, is an American rapper and record producer from Houston, Texas. He is the owner of Paid in Full Entertainment and the former host of the Houston-based radio talk show Madd Hatta Morning Show on KBXX 97.9 The Box.  He's currently curating Klassic Joints a 24/7-365 digital streaming app that plays classic Hip-hop and Super Throwback Party which is a 24/7-365 free digital streaming app that plays the best of the 90's-2000's hip-hop and R&B.

Discography
Albums
 1995 – All About Me
 1995 – Serious
 1997 – The pH Factor
 1999 – Mista Madd & The Supa Thuggz
 2000 – Can I Live?
 2007 – Still Standing

References

External links
Hatta's Old School Music Blog
Hatta's Old School Radio Show

Living people
Radio personalities from Texas
Year of birth missing (living people)